Ministry of Manpower may refer to:

 Ministry of Manpower and Income Security (Quebec) in Canada
 Ministry of Manpower and Emigration (Egypt)
 Ministry of Manpower (Indonesia)
 Ministry of Manpower (Pakistan)
 Ministry of Manpower (Singapore)